Preston is a city of Lancashire, England. The districts of Preston vary in size and shape, many of which reflect the districts developed from former villages and boroughs which now lie within the boundaries of the city of Preston. Districts of Preston have little administrative purpose: for local elections voters in each return either two, or three, councillors to Town Hall. For the purposes of national General elections, the parliamentary constituencies representing the city use the electoral districts as "building bricks"

Present day divisions
The City of Preston is divided into 22 wards, which are used in the creation of "Area Forums", local consultative bodies organised by city council; and also the composition of parliamentary constituencies.

Electors in each ward return two, or three, electors to Town Hall in elections, results of which can be found at Preston local elections.

Since 2010, the City of Preston has been covered by three parliamentary constituencies, Preston, Wyre and Preston North and Fylde. Those wards formerly within the Ribble Valley constituency, on the whole, now form the southern flank of the newly created constituency of Wyre and Preston North.

The wards are used to build electoral divisions for elections to Lancashire County Council. The unparished area of Preston (or urban core) had a population of 122,719 in 2011 and did not include the wards Preston Rural North, Preston Rural East and Lea. The wider city and non metropolitan district had a population of 140,202 in the same census.

The wards of Preston Rural North, Preston Rural East and Lea are parished: they contain parish councils with their own structure and elected councillors. All the other wards lie in an unparished area and are governed directly by Preston City Council.

Comparison of areas called "Preston"

The name "Preston" is associated with a number of different areas that are related to the city:

Historical

Local government
 Preston Municipal Borough 1836–1889
 County Borough of Preston 1889–1974
 Fulwood Urban District until 1974
 Preston Rural District 1894–1974

UK Parliament constituencies
 Preston 1295–1950; 1983–present
 Wyre and Preston North 2010–present
 Preston North 1950–1983
 Preston South 1950–1983

References

External links
Preston City Council website
Former ward divisions
Current ward divisions

Local government in Preston
 
Preston City Council elections
Lancashire-related lists